Eric R. Pratt (born January 23, 1964) is a Minnesota politician and member of the Minnesota Senate. A member of the Republican Party of Minnesota, he represents District 55 in the southwestern Twin Cities metropolitan area.

Early life, education, and career
Pratt's family moved to Prior Lake, Minnesota in 1978, where he graduated from Prior Lake High School. His father was a commercial banker for Bank of America and a commercial real estate broker. His mother taught elementary school for 40 years, finishing her career in Shakopee, Minnesota.

He attended the University of Colorado Boulder, graduating in 1987 with a B.A. in economics, and the University of St. Thomas, graduating in 1993 with an M.B.A. Pratt played outside linebacker for the University of Colorado Buffaloes under Hall of Fame head coach Bill McCartney. He was also a member of Sigma Phi Epsilon fraternity.

He was a member of the Prior Lake-Savage School Board from 2000 to 2012 and served as its chair.

Minnesota Senate
Pratt was elected to the Minnesota Senate in 2012, winning with 55% of the vote over Kathy Busch in the general election on November 6, 2012. He was reelected on November 6, 2016, over Ali C. Ali with 69% of the vote. In 2020 he won reelected over DFL nominee Sahra Odowa with 62% of the vote.

In the 90th and 91st Minnesota Legislature he was an Assistant Majority Leader. He was also a Majority Whip in the 91st Minnesota Legislature.

Personal life
Pratt is married to his wife, Tina. They have two children and reside in Prior Lake, Minnesota. Pratt is a risk manager.

References

External links

Senator Eric Pratt official Minnesota Senate website
Senator Eric Pratt official campaign website

1964 births
Living people
University of Colorado Boulder alumni
University of St. Thomas (Minnesota) alumni
Republican Party Minnesota state senators
School board members in Minnesota
21st-century American politicians
People from Prior Lake, Minnesota